Rapture is an album by American pop singer Johnny Mathis that was released on September 17, 1962, by Columbia Records and returned him to singing a full line-up of the sort of ballads that he was known for.

The album made its first appearance on Billboard magazine's album chart in the October 27, 1962, issue and reached number 12 during its 37 weeks there.

The first compact disc release of the album came on June 9, 2009, when it was issued as disc one of a two-CD set that also included his 1963 offering Romantically.

Reception
Billboard captured the feel of the album in their review. "'Velvety' is a good one-word description of this new album by Mathis, who's given lush musical settings by Don Costa's ork." They also singled out certain tracks. "The material is all in a softly romantic vein, with 'My Darling, My Darling', 'Stars Fell on Alabama', and 'Stella by Starlight' among the best." The review also noted that a small reproduction of the cover painting was included with the LP as a bonus.

Track listing

Side one
"Rapture" (Marian Kennedy) – 3:20
"Love Me as Though There Were No Tomorrow" from the musical Strip for Action (Harold Adamson, Jimmy McHugh) – 3:08
"Moments Like This" from College Swing (Burton Lane, Frank Loesser) – 2:50
"You've Come Home" from Wildcat (Cy Coleman, Carolyn Leigh) – 3:58
"Here I'll Stay" from Love Life (Alan Jay Lerner, Kurt Weill)– 4:20
"My Darling, My Darling" from Where's Charley? (Loesser) – 3:45

Side two
"Stars Fell on Alabama" (Mitchell Parish, Frank Perkins) – 3:24
"I Was Telling Her About You" (Moose Charlap, Don George) – 3:38
"Lament (Love, I Found You Gone)" (Joe Bailey, Morris Levy, Dinah Washington) – 3:20
"The Love Nest" from the musical Mary (Otto Harbach, Louis Hirsch) – 3:05
"Lost in Loveliness" from The Girl in Pink Tights (Leo Robin, Sigmund Romberg) – 4:19
"Stella by Starlight" (Ned Washington, Victor Young) – 3:33

Recording dates
From the liner notes for The Voice of Romance: The Columbia Original Album Collection:
August 1, 1962 — "Love Me as Though There Were No Tomorrow", "Rapture", "Stars Fell on Alabama", "You've Come Home"
August 6, 1962 — "I Was Telling Her About You", "Lost in Loveliness"
August 7, 1962 — "Here I'll Stay", "Lament (Love, I Found You Gone)"
August 8, 1962 — "The Love Nest", "Moments Like This", "My Darling, My Darling", "Stella by Starlight"

Personnel
Johnny Mathis – vocals
Ernie Altschuler – producer
Don Costa – arranger and conductor
Ralph Cowan – cover painting

References

Bibliography

1962 albums
Johnny Mathis albums
Albums arranged by Don Costa
Albums conducted by Don Costa
Columbia Records albums